John Clifford West  (June 1922 – October 2016) was president of the Institution of Electrical Engineers and vice-chancellor of the University of Bradford. He was a philatelist who specialised in Chile and was appointed to the Roll of Distinguished Philatelists in 2000. He was a fellow of the Institute of Paper Conservation and the Royal Philatelic Society London.

Selected publications
 Post Marks of Valparaiso (joint author)

References

1922 births
2016 deaths
Academics of the University of Bradford
British electrical engineers
British philatelists
Commanders of the Order of the British Empire
Fellows of the Royal Philatelic Society London
Philately of Chile
Signatories to the Roll of Distinguished Philatelists